Nicky Mason is a male former international table tennis player from England.

Table tennis career
He represented England during the 1988 European Table Tennis Championships, where he won a silver medal in the team event. He was also six times National doubles champion partnering Sky Andrew from 1987-1994.

See also
 List of England players at the World Team Table Tennis Championships

References

English male table tennis players
1965 births
Living people